Bradford Louis Springer (May 9, 1904 – January 4, 1970) was a Major League Baseball pitcher.

External links

1904 births
1970 deaths
St. Louis Browns players
Major League Baseball pitchers
Baseball players from Detroit